Noble Academy may refer to:

Noble Academy Cleveland, a public charter school in Ohio
Noble Academy (Chicago), a public charter four-year high school
Noble Academy (Greensboro, North Carolina), an independent day school